Pakta or Paqtaqan is an autumn feast and festival Turkic and Altai folklore. Arranged for the god that called Pakta. So this is a blessing, fertility and abundance ceremony.

Description
Pakta was a mythological male character associated with youth and autumnal time in early Turkic mythology, particularly within Altai, Siberia and Central Asia. He is also a proctor spirit of harvest. Along with her male companion Payna (pine goddess) he was associated with rituals conducted in rural areas during fall at harvest time. In the nineteenth century, Altai peasants celebrated the arrival of spring on September 21 by going out to the fields. They sang songs naming the autumn season Pakta. The word "Pakta" is still the mythological word for "abundance" in the Altai language, as well as Old Turkic. Hence he is an abundance god. Also, Pakta is a word related with name of the god Bakhty, the son of Ülgen.

Sources
  Türk Söylence Sözlüğü (Turkish Mythology Dictionary), Deniz Karakurt, (OTRS: CC BY-SA 3.0)

References

See also
 Paynaqan
 Nardoqan
 Kosaqan
 Sayaqan

Turkish folklore
Turkic mythology